Patti Page Sings for Romance is a 1954 Patti Page LP issued by Mercury Records as catalog number MG-25185. It was released as an EP with four songs, as well.

Billboard reviewed the album on October 30, 1954 saying, inter alia,:
 
“Patti Page Sings for Romance – Patti Page Song Souvenir – Mercury 25185, 25187
... Both of these new LPs should appeal to her large teen-age following and to the older crowd as well. For both sets contain tunes of the 1934-’37 period, and Patti sings them all with warmth, feeling and style for which she has become known…Dealers should be able to move many of these sets between now and Christmas.”

Track listing

References 

Patti Page albums
Mercury Records albums
1954 albums